is a hilltop-style Japanese castle located in the town of Miharu, Tamura District, Fukushima Prefecture, in the southern Tōhoku region of Japan. It also called Maizuru Castle (舞鶴城).  Built in 1543, the castle and its surrounding land is maintained by the government of Japan as a public park. Built in the Sengoku period and occupied by a succession of daimyō of Miharu Domain under the Edo period Tokugawa shogunate, the site is now a public park noted for its sakura.

Background
Miharu Castle is located on the 407-meter Shiroyama hill in the Abukuma Mountains near the center of current Fukushima prefecture, and commands a crossing point of the north-south route connecting Shirakawa with Kōriyama and the east-west route between Aizu-Wakamatsu and the Sōma territories on the eastern coast. The fortification are located in an L-shaped plateau located approximately 80-meters up the hillside. The upper enclosure was the site was residence of the lord, and the lower enclosure contained a three-story donjon. Along the lower half of the hill, a ridge extends on all sides, and contained secondary enclosures. The area of the castle was very compact.

History
The exact date of the foundation of Miharu Castle is unknown, but it was constructed by Tamura Yoshiaki at around 1504 AD. The Tamura clan claimed descent from the Heian period general Sakanoue Tamuramaro who conquered this region from the Emishi, so the origins of the fortifications may be much older. By the time of the Muromachi period, the Tamura clan had declined and the Miharu area was divided between many competing small warlords. Although Tamura Yoshiaki was aggressive in attacking its neighbours and expanding the Tamura holdings, his position was threatened by the growing power of the Date clan to the north, the Ashina clan to the west and the Sōma clan to the east.

The Tamura chose to ally with Date clan. Yoshiaki's grandson, Tamura Kiyoaki, sent his daughter Yoshihime (1568-1653) as a formal wife to Date Masamune; however, after the death of Kiyoaki the situation within the Tamura clan became weak. When Date Masamune submitted to Toyotomi Hideyoshi at the Siege of Odawara (1590), he did not permit any member of the Tamura clan to accompany him. As a result, their lands were declared forfeit and were annexed by the Date; however, Date Masamune was forced to give up his holdings in what is now Fukushima by Hideyoshi the following year. Hideyoshi gave the territories to Gamō Ujisato, who then embarked on a program to modernise the major castles of his territory with features such as stone walls and combined gates. Along with Nihonmatsu Castle and Inawashiro Castle, Miharu Castle was also modernised.

After the death of Ujisato in 1595, the territory went to Uesugi Kagekatsu. The Uesugi clan lost the territory as a result of the Battle of Sekigahara and were transferred to Yonezawa by the new Tokugawa shogunate. The shogunate created the 30,000 koku Miharu Domain for Katō Akitoshi, a younger son of Katō Yoshiaki in 1627. he was transferred to Nihonmatsu Domain the following year and replaced by Matsushita Nagatsuna, formerly of Nihonmatsu, who ruled until dispossessed in 1644.

In 1645, the Akita clan was transferred from Shishido Domain in Hitachi Province, and the kokudaka of the domain was increased to 50,000 koku. The Akita ruled until the Meiji restoration. During the Boshin War, although Miharu Doman was a member of the Ōuetsu Reppan Dōmei, the castle was surrounded without a fight to the Meiji government.

Current situation
After the Meiji revolution, all the remaining structures of the castle were removed, except for the main gate of the han school. The shape of the earthen ramparts largely remains and the area is used as a public park famed for its sakura trees in spring. The castle was listed as one of the Continued Top 100 Japanese Castles in 2017.

References

Literature

External links
Japan Castle
Japan reference

Castles in Fukushima Prefecture
Ruined castles in Japan
Parks and gardens in Fukushima Prefecture
Miharu, Fukushima
Mutsu Province
Iwashiro Province
Akita clan